André Fernand Charlet (23 April 1898 – 24 November 1954) was a French ice hockey player. He competed in the men's tournaments at the 1924 Winter Olympics and the 1928 Winter Olympics.

References

1898 births
1954 deaths
Ice hockey players at the 1924 Winter Olympics
Ice hockey players at the 1928 Winter Olympics
Olympic ice hockey players of France
People from Chamonix
Sportspeople from Haute-Savoie